Xen is a hypervisor allowing multiple computer operating systems to execute on the same computer hardware concurrently.

Xen may also refer to:
 Xen, a programming language, now part of Cω
 Xen (Half-Life), a fictional location of the computer game Half-Life
 Xen (album), by Arca, 2014

People
 Xen C. Scott (1882–1924), American sports coach
 Xen Balaskas (1910–1994), South African cricketer

See also
 Xen Cuts, a compilation album from the record label Ninja Tune
 Zen (disambiguation)